Muircheartach Ó Cobhthaigh was an Irish poet, a member of the Ó Cobhthaigh clan of poets from County Westmeath. He is known as the author of six extant poems:

 Le dís cuirthear clú Laighean
 Dlighidh liaigh leigheas a charad, one hundred and forty verses, (edited by Lambert McKenna in 1949)
 Mairg as dáileamh don digh bhróin, on the death of Garret Nugent, Baron of Delvin (NLI MS G 992 (Nugent Manuscript) f.33v)
 Do-ní clú áit oighreachda one hundred and twenty-four verses on William Nugent (MS G 992, f.34v)
 Geall re hairlachd ainm barúin on the death of Christopher Nugent, 14th Baron Delvin (MS G 992, f. 35v)
 Séd fine teisd Thoirrdhealbhaigh (edited by Ó Cróinín)

Other poems by him may yet survive but cannot now be ascribed.

References
 Some Irish bardic poems lxxxx, Lambert McKenna, Studies 38 (1949), 183–8.
 A poem to Toirdhealbhach Luinneach Ó Néill, Dáibhí Ó Cróinín, Éigse 16/1 (1975-6), 50–66.
 The Tinnakill dunaire, Anne Sullivan, Celtica 11, (1976), 214–28.
 A poem to Aodh Buidhe and Alasdar Mac Domhnaill of Tinnakill, Eoghan Ó Raghallaigh, Ossory, Laois and Leinster 2 (2006)
 Ó Cobhthaigh family, pp. 435–436, in Oxford Dictionary of National Biography, volume 41, Norbury-Osbourne, September 2004.

People from County Westmeath
16th-century Irish writers
Irish-language poets
16th-century Irish poets
People of Elizabethan Ireland